Henry of Brunswick-Lüneburg (Latin Henricus, died 14 October 1416), Duke of Brunswick-Lüneburg, called Henry the Mild, was prince of Lüneburg from 1388 to 1409 jointly with his brother Bernard I, Duke of Brunswick-Lüneburg, from 1400 to 1409 also of Wolfenbüttel, and from 1409 until his death sole prince of Lüneburg.

Henry was the fourth son of Magnus with the Necklace, Duke of Brunswick-Lüneburg. He participated in the prosecution of the murderers of his brother Frederick, elected King of the Romans, after 1400. Henry ravaged the Eichsfeld, a possession of the archbishop of Mainz, who was suspected to be involved in the murder. Only in 1405, a peace was ratified between Brunswick-Lüneburg and the Archbishopric.

In 1404, Henry was kidnapped by Bernard VI, Count of Lippe; when he paid a ransom, he was released, and later, with the support of King Rupert, took revenge on Bernard.

After the death of Gerhard, Count of Schleswig, Henry's sister's husband, Queen Margaret I of Denmark tried to take control of Schleswig, but Henry, together with Holstein, successfully defended Schleswig.

Family

Henry married Sophie (died 1406), daughter of Wartislaw VI, Duke of Pomerania, in 1388. Children were: 
 William (c. 1392–1482)
 Catherine (1395–1442), married Frederick I, Elector of Saxony

Henry married Margaret (c. 1389–1446), daughter of Hermann II, Landgrave of Hesse, in 1409. They had one known child:

 Henry (c. 1411–1473)

References

  Zedlers Universal-Lexicon, vol. 12, p. 775-776
  Allgemeine Deutsche Biographie, vol. 11, p. 486-488
 

14th-century births
1416 deaths
Princes of Lüneburg
Princes of Wolfenbüttel
Middle House of Brunswick
Burials at Brunswick Cathedral